Niccolò Ridolfi (1501 – 31 January 1550) was an Italian cardinal.

Early life
Born in Florence, son of Piero Ridolfi and Contessina de' Medici (the daughter of Lorenzo de' Medici the Magnificent). His father was a Gonfaloniere of Justice. The family was wealthy and prominent. Pope Leo X was Niccolò's maternal uncle and granted him a quick ecclesiastical career. He was named governor of Spoleto in the period 1514-1516 and protonotary apostolic at the age of thirteen. Niccolò became a long time friend of humanist Gian Giorgio Trissino, who served Leo as his Nuncio in Germany.

Church career

Pope Leo X created him cardinal deacon in the consistory of 1 July 1517 at the age of sixteen with the deaconry of SS. Vito e Modesto. Later his uncle appointed him administrator of the see of Orvieto on 24 August 1520 and he kept that post until 3 September 1529. Ridolfi participated in the conclaves of 1521–1522 and 1523.

Pope Clement VII named him  archbishop of Florence on 11 January 1524. He resigned from that position on 11 October 1532. He served also as administrator of  Vicenza from 14 March 1524 until his death. In 1537 he invited the Angelic Sisters of Saint Paul to Vicenza, where they received the support of the Valmarana family. 

Ridolfi was administrator of Forlì (16 April 1526 - 7 August 1528). During the Sack of Rome (1527) he was taken hostage to Hugo of Moncada with other cardinals. Later he was named administrator of Viterbo (16 November 1532 – 6 June 1533), administrator of the metropolitan see of Salerno (7 February 1533 - 19 December 1548) and administrator of  Imola (4 August 1533 - 17 May 1546). Pope Clement VII opted him for the deaconry of Santa Maria in Cosmedin on 19 January 1534. He participated in the Papal conclave, 1534.

Pope Paul III appointed him administrator of Viterbo again (8 August 1538 - 25 May 1548) and opted him for the deaconry of Santa Maria in Via Lata on 31 May 1540] as he became cardinal protodeacon. He was a member of a special commission of eleven cardinals for reform of the Roman Curia. On 8 January 1543 he was named Archbishop of Florence for second time and resigned again on 25 May 1548.

After the death of Pope Paul III he was a papabile, entered the conclave of 1549 - 1550, but left because of illness. He died on 31 January 1550 of an apoplexy before the new Pope Julius III was elected on 7 February 1550. Cardinal Ridolfi was buried in the church of Sant'Agostino.

A patron of the arts, Ridolfi had an extensive collection of books, paintings, and sculpture that passed to his brother Lorenzo. A large armorial pitcher, currently held by the Metropolitan Museum of Art is believed to have been commissioned by Ridolfi on the occasion of Charles V's coronation in Bologna in 1530.

References

Bibliography
  [very tangential, of background value only]

 Una suprema magnificenza :Niccolo' Ridolfi a Florentine Cardinal in sixteenth-century Rome, by Lucinda Byatt, Ph.D. thesis, European University Institute, 1983.

External links
The Cardinals of the Holy Roman Church - Biographical Dictionary
Giga - Catholic Information for this cardinal

1501 births
1550 deaths
Clergy from Florence
House of Medici
16th-century Italian cardinals
Bishops of Forlì
Bishops of Orvieto
Bishops of Vicenza
Bishops of Viterbo
Cardinal-nephews
16th-century Italian Roman Catholic archbishops